Kaina Yoshio (吉尾 海夏, born 28 June 1998) is a Japanese footballer who plays as a winger for Yokohama F. Marinos in J1 League.

Club career
On 15 March 2017, Yoshio made his professional debut in J.League Cup against Cerezo Osaka.

Club statistics

Honours

Club 
Yokohama F. Marinos
 J1 League: 2022

References

External links

Profile at Yokohama F. Marinos 

1998 births
Living people
Japanese footballers
J1 League players
J2 League players
Yokohama F. Marinos players
Vegalta Sendai players
FC Machida Zelvia players
Association football midfielders